The Upper Orinoco tree frog (Boana wavrini) is a species of frog in the family Hylidae found in Brazil, Colombia, and 
Venezuela, and possibly Bolivia and Guyana. Its natural habitats are subtropical or tropical moist lowland forests, subtropical or tropical swamps, moist savanna, and rivers.
It is threatened by habitat loss.

References

Boana
Amphibians of Brazil
Amphibians of Colombia
Amphibians of Venezuela
Amphibians described in 1936
Taxonomy articles created by Polbot